Thomas Hinton (died 3 September 1757) was a Canon of Windsor from 1751 to 1757

Career

He was appointed:
Assistant curate of St Chad's Church, Lichfield
Vicar of Hartley Westpall, Hampshire 1753 - 1757

He was appointed to the second stall in St George's Chapel, Windsor Castle in 1751, and held the stall until 1757.

References 

1757 deaths
Canons of Windsor
Year of birth missing